The Mexican Heritage Plaza - Centro Cultural de San José is a Chicano/Mexican-American cultural center in San Jose, California, located in the Mayfair neighborhood of East San Jose.

History
Mexican Heritage Plaza opened in 1999. It is operated by the School of Arts and Culture.

Facilities
The plaza includes a 500-seat theater, gardens, classrooms, and meeting spaces.

Art
The Corazón y Espíritu de Mayfair mural was painted in 2004 by Precita Eyes Muralists.

A series of mosaic tributes to Chicano and Mexican-American artists lines the north western entrance to the plaza. Tributes include guitarist Carlos Santana (Bay Area native), musical group Los Tigres del Norte (who began their recording career in San Jose), playwright Luis Valdez (who grew up in San Jose), and singer Linda Ronstadt (who serves as the honorary chair of the SJ Mexican Heritage Festival).

External links
Official website
Online video tour of Mexican Heritage Plaza (scrolling the image may not work on all browsers)

Buildings and structures in San Jose, California
Culture of San Jose, California
Mexican-American culture in California
Chicano art